Dendrochilum longifolium is a species of orchid, commonly known as the long-leaved dendrochilum.

longifolium